Stranger Things is the original soundtrack for the first season of the Netflix series of the same name. The first and second volume were released digitally by Lakeshore and Ivada Records on August 12 and 19, 2016, respectively. Consisting of 75 songs produced and composed by Kyle Dixon and Michael Stein of the electronic band Survive, this release sums up to the duo's first collaboration outside of the band. The CD release of the soundtrack was similar to the digital rollout, with the first and second volumes being released on September 16 and 23, respectively, and limited editions on vinyl, in both individual and boxed sets, were released in July 2017. A cassette version of the first volume of the soundtrack, sold exclusively by Urban Outfitters, was released on July 14, 2017. The cassette packaging features a cardboard cover that emulates an old VHS sleeve, while the cassette tape is made to look like a VHS tape.

Both volumes were nominated individually for Best Score Soundtrack for Visual Media at the 59th Annual Grammy Awards, though neither won.

Track listings

Volume 1
The first volume of the soundtrack was released on August 12, 2016, and features the show's wildly popular main theme, along with a number of the season's other common musical motifs ("Kids" and "Hawkins"), and Eleven's theme ("Eleven").

Volume 2
The second volume of the soundtrack was released on August 19, 2016, and features an extended version of the show's main theme as well as an alternate version of one of the show's more prominent musical motifs, "Kids" ("Kids Two").

Charts
Volume One garnered 14,000 "equivalent album units" in the United States in its first week of sale according to Nielsen Soundscan.

References

Music of Stranger Things
Television soundtracks
2016 soundtrack albums